MCGA may refer to:

IBM Multi-Color Graphics Array
Maritime and Coastguard Agency, in the United Kingdom
Magnus Chase and the Gods of Asgard, a fantasy novel series by Rick Riordan.